Walnut Grove School District may refer to:

 Walnut Grove Elementary School District, Arizona
 Walnut Grove R-V School District, Missouri

See also
 Walnut Grove School (disambiguation)